Matlhako is a village in Central District of Botswana. The village is located 25 km south-east of Palapye, and it has a primary school. The population was 679 in 2001 census.

References

Populated places in Central District (Botswana)
Villages in Botswana